Yakamoz S-245 is a Turkish apocalyptic sci-fi drama thriller streaming television series created by Jason George, inspired by the 2015 Polish science fiction novel The Old Axolotl by Jacek Dukaj. The series premiered on Netflix on April 20, 2022, and is a spin-off of the Belgian series Into the Night.

Reception 
In the week of its opening, the series was reported to be the third most watched non-English TV series on Netflix.

Production 
Shooting took place in various locations in Turkey: İzmir, Balıkesir, Foça, and Ayvalık (especially Cunda Island) as well as on a Turkish Ay (Moon) class submarine.

Episodes

See also
 Turkish Naval Forces

References

External links
 
 

Apocalyptic television series
2022 Turkish television series debuts
2020s science fiction television series
2020s Turkish television series
Nautical television series
Post-apocalyptic television series
Post-apocalyptic web series
Serial drama television series
Thriller television series
Science fiction web series
Television shows based on Polish novels
Television spin-offs
Turkish-language Netflix original programming